Coleman Lindsey was an American politician who served in the Louisiana Senate from 1924 to 1928 and 1932 to 1939 as a Democrat, when he became Lieutenant Governor of Louisiana.

References

Lieutenant Governors of Louisiana
Democratic Party Louisiana state senators